The Citigroup Center (formerly Citicorp Center and also known by its address, 601 Lexington Avenue) is an office skyscraper in the Midtown Manhattan neighborhood of New York City. The building was designed by architect Hugh Stubbins, associate architect Emery Roth & Sons, and structural engineer William LeMessurier.

601 Lexington Avenue takes up much of a city block bounded clockwise from west by Lexington Avenue, 54th Street, Third Avenue, and 53rd Street.  The building has a 45° angled top with a base on four stilts, as well as a six-story office annex to the east. The tower overhangs St. Peter's Evangelical Lutheran Church at Lexington Avenue and 54th Street, a standalone granite structure designed simultaneously by Stubbins. Also at the base is a sunken plaza, a shopping concourse, and entrances to the church and the New York City Subway's Lexington Avenue/51st Street station. The tower stories are supported by stacked load-bearing braces in the form of inverted chevrons. Upon Citicorp Center's completion, it received mixed reviews from architectural critics, but also several architectural accolades.

Land acquisition for what became Citicorp Center commenced in 1968 and took five years. St. Peter's Church sold its plot on the condition that a new church building be constructed at the base of the tower. The design was announced in July 1973 and the structure was completed in October 1977. During the Citicorp Center engineering crisis less than a year after the building's completion, emergency repairs were made after the tower was discovered to be vulnerable to collapse due to wind. The building was acquired by Boston Properties and Citicorp Center was renamed 601 Lexington Avenue in the 2000s. The New York City Landmarks Preservation Commission designated 601 Lexington Avenue as a city landmark in 2016. Over the years, the atrium, plaza, and other public spaces have been renovated.

Site 

The building is in the Midtown Manhattan neighborhood of New York City. It takes up the majority of a city block bounded by Lexington Avenue to the west, 54th Street to the north, Third Avenue to the east, and 53rd Street to the south. The only other building on the block is 880 Third Avenue, an 18-story structure at 53rd Street and Third Avenue. Other nearby buildings include 599 Lexington Avenue to the south, 100 East 53rd Street and the Seagram Building to the southwest, 399 Park Avenue to the west, the Central Synagogue to the northwest, and the Lipstick Building to the east. The New York City Subway's Lexington Avenue/51st Street station (served by the ) is directly underneath 601 Lexington Avenue.

Custom street furniture including newsstands, flagpoles, and streetlight pylons was designed for the sidewalks around 601 Lexington Avenue and installed in 1978. New Jersey-based company Designetics designed pylons with a cruciform cross-section and street lamps at the top. Seven pylons are placed in the middle of the block. Three custom pylons, at the northwest, northeast, and southwest corners of the block, include pedestrian and vehicular traffic lights. The pylons were initially designed with a "glossy black finish" that contrasted with the tower's aluminum facade; by 2016, they had been painted gray. The New Yorker described the pylons in 2017 as "sculptural towers worthy of Brancusi".

Thirty-one structures were acquired and demolished to make way for the development. Most of these were brownstone houses; some contained commercial spaces, ranging from small shops to the upscale Cafe Chauveron. The site also included the Medical Chambers on 54th Street, which was owned by forty doctors. The only remaining previous occupant of the site is St. Peter's Evangelical Lutheran Church, whose sanctuary at Lexington Avenue and 54th Street, on the northwest corner of the block, was rebuilt when the Citigroup Center was developed.

Architecture 

601 Lexington Avenue, also known as the Citigroup Center and Citicorp Center, was designed by architect Hugh Stubbins as the headquarters for First National City Bank (later Citibank), along with associate architect Emery Roth & Sons. Of the principals at Hugh A. Stubbins & Associates, architect Peter Woytuk was most involved in design, while project manager W. Easley Hammer oversaw construction. In addition, Edward Larrabee Barnes was the consulting architect, and LeMessurier Associates and James Ruderman were the structural engineers. The general contractor was HRH Construction Corporation and the steel contractor was Bethlehem Steel. Various other contractors were hired to supply material for the building.

Form and facade 
Excluding unused floor numbers at the base, it contains 46 office stories. At the time of completion, Citicorp Center was the seventh-tallest building in the world. In addition to the primary 59-story tower, there is an annex at 159 East 53rd Street with six or seven stories. It extends east to Third Avenue and includes part of the building's shopping concourse. The facades of the tower and its annex are designed similarly.

The facade is made of anodized aluminum and reflective glass panels. Each facade segment measures  and consists of both glass panes and aluminum plates. As an energy-saving measure, the glass windows were manufactured as two panes, the inner pane of which was coated with chrome plating. The windows on each floor are separated by flush aluminum spandrels. The spandrels were manufactured by Flour City Architectural Metals, a firm based in Glen Cove, New York. The aluminum is silver-colored, like that on the Pepsi-Cola Building and One Chase Manhattan Plaza, because Stubbins thought a dark color would not allow observers to "see the shade and shadow". The metal panels were fitted with double the amount of insulation considered normal at the time of construction. The aluminum was polished to reflect heat from sunlight.

Roof 
Before the official plans were announced in 1973, the architects had intended the roof to be terraces for apartments, which would have faced westward. There would have been about 100 apartments, but the New York City Department of City Planning would not approve a zoning change to permit that use. The architects then rotated the roof southward to accommodate flat-plate solar collectors that could produce hot water, which would be used to dehumidify air and reduce cooling energy. Starting in February 1975, engineers from the Massachusetts Institute of Technology conducted a twelve-month feasibility study for the installation of such a system. Afterward, the system was scrapped, either because of the low savings, refinement of mechanical systems, or disputes with the supplier.

Even after the solar-collector plans were scrapped, the design was kept; Stubbins wrote that the roof "relieves the uniformity of flat-topped towers proliferating in the center of the city". This made Citicorp Center the first postmodern skyscraper whose roof was designed solely for decorative purposes. The roof was also fitted with solar panels in 1983, when Consolidated Edison and Citibank sponsored a four-year solar panel test.

Exterior spaces

Plaza 

A large plaza  beneath street level was built along with Citicorp Center and designed by landscape architect Hideo Sasaki. The plaza was included under the 1961 Zoning Resolution, which allowed New York City developers a zoning "bonus" for including open space in front of their buildings. While many developers took advantage of the "bonus", the New York City Planning Commission found in 1975 that many of these plazas ranged from "bleak, forlorn places" to "forbidding and downright hostile". In response, the City Planning Commission's Urban Design Group had been formed in 1967 to determine how to improve plaza designs, influencing the commission's decision to modify the zoning laws in 1975. The design of 601 Lexington Avenue's plaza was finalized in 1973 before these rule changes were enacted. However, the plaza included many of the same features that were proposed in the rule change, such as an outdoor plaza, a covered pedestrian area, and an arcade running through the city block.

Its presence allowed the tower to be designed with a maximum floor area ratio of 18:1, higher than the 15:1 ratio specified for the area. The plaza is accessed by a set of stairs extending northeast from the corner of Lexington Avenue and 53rd Street. On the south side of the plaza is an entrance to the Lexington Avenue/51st Street subway station. This subway entrance replaces two staircases from the street, which were demolished to make way for Citicorp Center. The north side of the plaza contains the entrance to St. Peter's Church and the east side contains an entrance to the lower lobby. During the plaza's construction, the developers collaborated with the numerous public agencies with a stake in the project, including the Metropolitan Transportation Authority, which operated the subway station.

The plaza, interior shopping concourse, and sidewalks all initially contained brown brick floor pavers. There was also originally a fountain at the center of the plaza, which was designed to conceal noise from the environs, similar to the fountain at nearby Paley Park. 601 Lexington Avenue's fountain was demolished in 2017.

St. Peter's Lutheran Church 

St. Peter's Lutheran Church is on the northwest corner of the Citigroup Center site, at 619 Lexington Avenue and 54th Street. The exterior was designed by Stubbins and Hammer, while the interior was furnished by Vignelli Associates. The church occupies the same site as its old building. The congregation permitted Citicorp to erect the skyscraper only if a new church was built at the same location, structurally unconnected to the tower. Andrew Alpern and Seymour Durst characterized the agreement as "ecumenically joining God and mammon to the benefit of both". Additionally, at least 63 percent of the church had to contain "nothing built above it". According to Stubbins, the lack of structural connections would give the church a "breathing space" of its own.

It contains a facade of brown Caledonia granite with ashlar. The roof is clad in copper coated with lead. The materials were meant to establish a distinct identity for the church while also associating it with 601 Lexington Avenue's tower. At the top of the church, a skylight bisects the church building diagonally from southwest to northeast, allowing passersby to look into the church building. A window facing the corner of Lexington Avenue and 54th Street overlooks the pipe organ inside. Stubbins had intended the structure's shape to resemble a pair of hands "held up in prayer with light coming between them".

The main sanctuary is adjacent to the lower plaza, about  beneath the plaza. It has a capacity of 850 seats; the center set of pews is designed to be movable so the space could host events when needed. There was also a black-box theater, a library, kitchen, daycare center, clergy offices, dressing rooms, choir rooms, and lecture and community rooms. Upon the church's completion, there was a two-manual, two-pedal organ with 2,175 pipes. Inside the church is the Nevelson Chapel (also known as the Chapel of the Good Shepherd), which was donated by parishioner Erol Beker and designed by sculptor Louise Nevelson. The 24-seat chapel measures  and contains sculptural elements on the wall including reliefs, altarpieces, and columns. It was renovated in the 1980s, and it was restored from 2018 to 2019 by Kostow Greenwood Architects as part of a $5.75 million renovation partly funded by Nevelson's Pace Gallery. The space was described by David W. Dunlap in 2004 as the city's "most architecturally successful postwar sanctuary".

The church's basement theater is used by the York Theatre. St. Peter's Church also hosts a jazz ministry created by the Rev. John Garcia Gensel, who in 1965 became the Minister to the Jazz Community. The jazz ministry has sponsored several programs over the years, such as free jazz performances at the base of Citicorp Center. The church has hosted memorials or funerals for jazz musicians such as Miles Davis, Dizzy Gillespie, and Thelonious Monk. In 2021, the church was seriously damaged after a broken water main flooded its space.

Structural features 
The tower stories are of "trussed tube" construction. Each of the tower stories measures , or  total. Within the tower stories, the elevators and emergency stairs are embedded in a service core at the center of each story. Overall, 601 Lexington Avenue contains  of steel, forty percent the amount used in the Empire State Building.

Stilts 
The stilts are underneath the centers of the tower's outer edges, cantilevering  outward from the core. According to Stanley Goldstein of LeMessurier's New York City office, stilts at the center of each edge were able to withstand forces from "quartering winds" from the corners, compared to stilts that were placed at the corner. Additionally, the placement of the stilts allowed a smaller foundation than in a conventional building of similar size.

Each of the individual stilts is composed of four vertical beams, of which the outer pairs are much heavier than the inner pairs. This design makes each stilt similar to a vertical K-truss, which prevents the stilt from buckling. Although the stilts could have theoretically been thinner, they were enlarged to give the tower a more stable appearance. Inside the stilts are emergency stairs and mechanical ducts. In 2002, following the September 11 attacks the previous year, one of the stilts was reinforced with blast-resistant shields of steel and copper as well as steel bracing. There is also an octagonal elevator core in the middle of the building, which measures  and carries the structural loads from gravity. Unlike on the upper stories, the elevator core contains only elevators, as the emergency staircases are within the stilts.

Chevrons 
Above the stilts are stacked load-bearing braces in the form of inverted chevrons, which are designed to distribute tension loads from the upper stories that are created by wind. On each side, there are six chevrons, each of which absorb wind loads at intervals of eight stories. The wind loads from each eight-story tier are transferred into the center of the frame, where  "mast column transports" extend the full height of the tower. The tops of each eight-story tier (where the diagonal beams meet the corner) do not contain vertical columns, thus preventing wind loads from accumulating at the tower's corners.

The ninth story, the lowest level above the stilts, contains a trussed frame similar in design to a cantilever bridge, where the wind loads are transferred downward into the stilts. This story is used as a mechanical room.

The chevrons are not visible from the exterior but can be seen from the offices inside, in contrast to structures such as Chicago's John Hancock Center. After Citicorp Center's completion, W. Easley Hammer reflected that he thought it was a mistake to conceal the chevrons, while LeMessurier said that Stubbins had rejected his idea for exposed chevrons. The chevrons were bolted to each other with over two hundred joints; as built, these posed a serious structural danger, leading to the Citicorp Center engineering crisis. As a result,  welded steel plates were installed over each joint in 1978.

Interior 

Base 
601 Lexington Avenue's main entrance lobby is at the middle of the Lexington Avenue frontage, across a footbridge that provides entrance to St. Peter's Church. The lobby was constructed as part of a 2010 renovation.

There is a three-story shopping concourse at the base of the stilts, originally called the Market. The corner of Third Avenue and 54th Street contained an entrance to the lowest level of the shopping concourse, while on 54th Street was an entrance to the second level. The storefronts were designed to blend in with the plaza and street, with similar floor surfaces and transparent exterior walls. Overall, the stores were intended as a commitment to the city, a corporate symbol, and a tourist attraction, according to one of Citicorp's vice presidents, Arthur E. Driscoll. The bank presented a model train exhibition in the space each December from 1987 to 2009. The shopping concourse was renamed The Shops at Citicorp Center in 1995, and it is known as The Atrium .

Mechanical features 
In the office stories, the elevators and stairs are clustered in a central core. The building contains 20 double-deck elevators,  which Otis Worldwide constructed for $7 million. Although each of the upper or lower decks serves only odd or even floors, visitors can travel between odd and even floors using escalators. Each of the double-deck elevators consists of two standard elevator cabs that operate simultaneously in one shaft. The double-deck elevators cost 25 percent more than standard elevators but allowed a 24 percent reduction in the floor area taken up by elevators; namely, twenty-six single-deck elevator shafts would have been required otherwise. 601 Lexington Avenue's double-deck elevators were likely the first to be installed in New York City since 1932, when the Cities Service Building was completed. In total, 601 Lexington Avenue has 38 elevators.

Citicorp Center was also designed with other mechanical systems. At its completion, each tenant received mail from a "supermail" system. Incoming mail was sorted in the basement and transferred via lifts to each floor, where the mail was transported manually to fixed bins. The building also contained 2,500 sensors to monitor the mechanical systems, such as HVAC, lighting, electrical, sprinkler, life-safety, security, and elevator systems. The sloped roof includes mechanical equipment.

At the building's completion, it was intended to be energy-efficient. The building's water supply consisted of only cold water. Heat from the building's mechanical systems was recirculated to warm the water supply and heat the office spaces. The office spaces were cooled with outside air wherever it was practical. The fluorescent light bars in the ceiling, manufactured by Joseph Loring & Associates, were fitted with glass shields to spread the artificial light more efficiently, thereby requiring fewer lighting fixtures. Even though the rooftop solar collectors were not installed, the other features allowed the building to use 42 percent less energy compared to a regular office building of the same size. However, during the summer, the building used a conventional air-conditioning system, which offset the savings from the heat-deflecting facade.

Citicorp Center was the city's first skyscraper to feature a tuned mass damper (TMD). Located within the rooftop mechanical space, the TMD is designed to counteract swaying motions due to wind and reduces wind-related movement by up to fifty percent. The concrete block sits on a pool of oil within a steel plate and has two spring mechanisms, one each to counteract north-south and east-west movement. The equipment cost $1 million to install. By comparison, it would have cost $5 million to add mass to reduce the tower's movement, namely  of additional steel.

History 
National City Bank was founded in 1812 and, for over a century, had its headquarters in the Financial District of Lower Manhattan. The company was headquartered at 52 Wall Street until 1908, when it moved to 55 Wall Street. After National City Bank and the Farmers' Loan and Trust Company merged in 1929, these companies expanded into a new structure at 20 Exchange Place, completed in 1931. City Bank Farmers Trust moved to 399 Park Avenue, one block west of the present Citigroup Center, in 1961.

On the northwestern corner of the Citigroup site was St. Peter's Lutheran Church, which had been founded in 1862 as a German-speaking congregation. The church's previous structure, a Gothic building designed by John G. Michel and P. Brandner, was completed in 1905. The congregation's previous sanctuary at Lexington Avenue and 46th Street, which it had occupied since 1871, had been demolished in 1902 for the construction of Grand Central Terminal. The congregation, which at its peak had membership of over one thousand, had decreased to below 300 by the 1960s, prompting the congregation to consider relocating to near the United Nations headquarters.

Development

Site acquisition 
The lots on the St. Peter's block were acquired secretively in five and a half years starting around 1968. The acquisition was headed by brokers Donald Schnabel and Charles McArthur of Julien J. Studley Inc. The brokers believed that a large, continuous land lot would be worth more than the sum of each lot's individual worth, though the firm had not yet secured a client for which it was purchasing the lots. Furthermore, St. Peter's Church's membership was once again increasing and they were loath to part with their property. Subsequently, a Studley broker formed a company called Lexman, which then approached First National City Bank to determine their interest in the St. Peter's block, one block east of their headquarters at the time. Lexman gradually acquired the other lots on the block. Former Citicorp Chairman Walter B. Wriston reportedly decided to acquire several other low- and mid-rise buildings in the area, supposedly to buy out massage parlors and mom-and-pop stores in Midtown.

The firm again negotiated with St. Peter's congregation in late 1969 after some lots had been acquired. John White, president of James D. Landauer Associates consultants, proposed that the new structure on the site be a condominium development; i.e. the church would have a partial ownership stake in the new development. In February 1970, the congregation signed a "letter of intent" to sell its building, as well as the air rights above the church, to First National City Bank. In exchange, the congregation received $9 million and was named as a condominium partner in the tower's development. Subtracting the $5 million cost of the new church building, the congregation netted a $4 million profit.

By January 1971, Hugh Stubbins & Associates were hired to develop plans for a large building on the city block, and St. Peter's Church had hired Edward Larrabee Barnes to represent its design interests. The Stubbins firm was then relatively inexperienced in designing high-rise buildings. The New York Times characterized the site as an "annex" to First National City Bank's main building at 399 Park Avenue. The congregation of St. Peter's Church voted in May 1971 to approve the sale and construct a new structure on the same site, and they relocated in early 1973 to a temporary location at the Central Presbyterian Church. By July 1973, land acquisition was virtually complete, although the last parcel was not acquired until November 1975, when the lot at 884 Third Avenue was purchased. The acquisition cost was $40 million, making the site the most expensive city block on earth. The only lot not acquired was 880 Third Avenue, which had been completed in 1965, and which the brokers considered too new to be demolished.

Construction 
In addition to what became the final design, Stubbins and his associates studied at least six alternate proposals for the tower, with varying rooftop designs. Early plans also called for installing stilts underneath each corner. This plan was scrapped because the northwestern stilt would extend into St. Peter's Lutheran Church, and the church wanted its sanctuary to be structurally separate. Plans for the tower were publicly disclosed on July 24, 1973. The plans called for a -tall tower called Citicorp Center, raised above the street level on  stilts. The project would also include an eight-story office annex, three stories of retail, a landscaped public plaza, and a new church building. At the time, St. Peter's old church building had been demolished, and First National City Bank had become known as Citibank, a subsidiary of Citicorp.  St. Peter's pastor Ralph E. Peterson described the project as "a very bold venture in an urban environment". Under Peterson's insistence, the plans included a publicly accessible plaza with shopping. Early plans for the church also called for it to contain a cube design, though the church's final design was announced in April 1974.

Groundbreaking ceremonies for the tower occurred during April 1974, though actual work did not commence for twelve months. The tower's construction manager was supervised by Vivian Longo, who at the building's completion in 1977 was twenty-five years old. Citicorp Center was one of the few large structures in Manhattan under construction during the mid-1970s. At the peak of construction, three thousand people were employed on the project, and 565 workers were on site simultaneously. The steelwork had been completed to the eighteenth floor by the end of 1975. The steel frame was topped out on October 7, 1976. At the time, officials predicted Citicorp Center would be the only major structure in New York City to be completed in 1977.

The cornerstone for the new St. Peter's Church was laid on November 1, 1976, less than a month after the building had topped out. Citibank acquired two buildings at 148 and 152 East 53rd Street, immediately south of the new tower, the next month. The company did not intend to develop the sites of these buildings, but they contained topless bars, which Citibank officials perceived would decrease the value of the tower. The bank's vice president for real estate management, Arthur E. Driscoll, had studied vacancy rates at fourteen nearby "prime office buildings" while Citicorp Center was being developed. The first tenants moved to the building in April 1977. By that August, the building was 96 percent rented. This high occupancy rate was in spite of the fact that space in the building was rented at a higher average rate than in other buildings in the neighborhood.

Early years

Opening 

The building was dedicated on October 12, 1977. Stubbins gave an opening speech in which he described the building as a "skyscraper for the people". The project was the first to be completed under the purview of the Mayor's Office of Midtown Planning since its establishment a decade prior. At the time of the building's opening, the Market retail complex at the base was almost totally rented. Over three hundred retailers had submitted applications to operate within the space. The majority of the space was rented by household furnishings retailer Conran's, which occupied , but some of the other retailers included restaurants serving cuisine of various countries. Citibank planned to occupy , or 26 stories, moving its offices to the building from five other addresses in Midtown. The remaining stories were occupied by a variety of firms, including those in law and accounting, as well as the Consulate-General of Japan and IBM.

At the time of Citicorp Center's dedication, the final design features of St. Peter's Church were being installed. St. Peter's Church was dedicated on December 3, 1977, and the Nevelson Chapel was separately dedicated the same month. Initially, the tower's slanted roof created an ice problem during winter, as snow and ice would slide down the roof onto the sidewalk. Furthermore, the shopping concourse was initially only lightly used and largely unknown to the public. The plaza on Lexington Avenue opened by July 1978. In the complex's early years, St. Peter's Church encountered fiscal deficits because of high utility costs, as well as inflation and lack of investment experience, even though the church earned money from renting out some of the other space it owned at Citicorp Center. By 1980, Citicorp counted 25,000 daily visitors to the shopping concourse, but some of the stores had already closed down because of a lack of patronage.

Engineering crisis of 1978 

Due to material changes during construction, the building as initially completed was structurally unsound. LeMessurier's original design for the chevron load braces used welded joints. To save money, Bethlehem Steel changed the plans in 1974 to use bolted joints, which was accepted by LeMessurier's office but not known to the engineer himself. Furthermore, LeMessurier originally only needed to calculate wind loads from perpendicular winds under the building code; in typical buildings, loads from quartering winds at the corners would be less. In June 1978, after an inquiry from Princeton University engineering student Diane Hartley, LeMessurier recalculated the wind loads on the building with quartering winds. He found that quartering winds would significantly increase the load at the bolted joints. After conducting tests on the building's structural safety, LeMessurier found that a wind capable of toppling Citicorp Center would occur every 55 years on average, or every 16 years with the tuned mass damper powered off.

LeMessurier proposed welding steel plates over the bolted joints, and Karl Koch Erecting was hired for the welding process. Starting in August 1978, construction crews installed the welded panels at night. Repairs were completed that October, after which LeMessurier claimed that a wind strong enough to topple the building would occur less often than every 700 years. The work was not publicized at the time, as it took place during the 1978 New York City newspaper strike and very few people were notified of the issue at the time. Since no structural failure occurred, the extent of the engineering crisis was only publicly revealed in a lengthy article in The New Yorker in 1995.

1980s and 1990s 

As completed, Citicorp Center consisted of three separate ownership stakes in a condominium arrangement. One condominium was for the church while the other two were 61.55 and 32.85 percent ownership stakes in the office stories. In October 1987, Citicorp sold the 61.55 percent ownership stake (consisting of the 23rd through 59th floors), along with a one-third interest in its former 399 Park Avenue headquarters, to Dai-Ichi Mutual Life Insurance Company for $670 million. Citicorp used the profits from the sale to reduce its losses, which in the first half of 1987 totaled $2.32 billion and continued to own the remaining stories. At the time, Citicorp was also developing One Court Square across the East River in the Long Island City neighborhood of Queens. The new building in Queens was right above the Court Square–23rd Street subway station, one stop away from the Lexington Avenue–53rd Street station beneath Citicorp Center and 399 Park Avenue. The arrangement allowed Citicorp to split its offices between the buildings.

The Market shopping atrium fell into disrepair following Citicorp Center's completion. In May 1995, Citicorp commenced a $15 million, eighteen-month renovation of the shopping concourse, designed by Gwathmey Siegel & Associates Architects. The brick pavers were replaced with terrazzo, new signs were installed outside each storefront, and circulation features such as the placement of escalators were rearranged. The shopping concourse was renamed the Shops at Citicorp Center and bookstore Barnes & Noble was named as the anchor tenant, taking .

21st century 
By late 2000, Dai-Ichi's broker Jones Lang LaSalle had placed the entire Citigroup Center for sale. Dai-Ichi arranged with Citigroup, its condominium partner, to jointly sell both condominium units. Richard and Eric D. Hadar, a father-and-son venture, bid $725 million for Dai-Ichi's ownership stake in January 2001. For the purchase, Eric Hadar had arranged a $525 million first mortgage from Deutsche Bank and a $150 million mezzanine loan from the government of Singapore. The sale was delayed after Boston Properties offered to buy Dai-Ichi's stake. Eric Hadar's company, Allied Partners, along with Boston Properties, ultimately finalized their purchase of both condominium units that April. The building cost $755 million, including closing costs and taxes, and Citigroup relocated to 399 Park Avenue. One of the stilts was structurally reinforced following the September 11 attacks, and protective bollards were installed on the sidewalk.

Boston Properties bought Allied Partners' stake in the Citigroup Center in 2006 for $100 million. The same year, Boston Properties began rebranding the building as "601 Lexington Avenue". A new Lexington Avenue lobby was constructed and the tower stories' entrance was relocated from 53rd Street to Lexington Avenue. In addition, a ramp was installed on 53rd Street and a reception area was added to the northern entrance of St. Peter's Church. The name change became effective in 2010. Boston Properties was also considering selling naming rights to the building. By 2013, Citigroup only occupied three stories at 601 Lexington Avenue. The next year, Boston Properties sold a 45 percent ownership stake in 601 Lexington Avenue, along with a proportional stake at the Atlantic Wharf Office Building and 100 Federal Street in Boston, to Norges Bank Investment Management for a combined $1.5 billion.

In mid-2016, the New York City Landmarks Preservation Commission (LPC) proposed protecting twelve buildings in East Midtown, including 601 Lexington Avenue, in advance of proposed changes to the area's zoning. At the time, Boston Properties was contemplating renovations to the building; the company filed alteration plans for the plaza that July, and it was vacating the space in the office annex. On December 6, 2016, the LPC designated 601 Lexington Avenue as a city landmark. The designation made 601 Lexington Avenue the city's youngest landmark at that time. The same month, Boston Properties announced plans to renovate the office annex, which would be rebranded 159 East 53rd Street. Shortly afterward, in March 2017, Gensler revealed its design for a refurbished entry plaza and a new atrium space. That June, work on the plaza commenced and the original fountain was demolished, despite being part of the landmark designation. All of the space at the 159 East 53rd Street annex was leased to NYU Langone Health in 2018. Following the completion of the renovation, in late 2019, Anna Castellani signed a lease to operate a  food hall at the base of 601 Lexington Avenue. In October 2019, London-based company etc.venues signed a lease to operate a  conference center on the 14th floor.

In December 2021, Boston Properties and Norges Bank Investment Management refinanced 601 Lexington Avenue with a $1 billion, 10-year fixed rate mortgage from a consortium of four banks. At the time, the building's office space was 96.3 percent occupied, and the tenants largely included financial firms and law offices. Other large tenants included Citibank, Kirkland & Ellis, and Freshfields Bruckhaus Deringer.

Impact

Critical reception 

During Citicorp Center's construction, the building received large media attention, it had been one of three new office buildings in Manhattan whose plans were approved in 1974. After the design was announced, Ada Louise Huxtable criticized the design in The New York Times, saying the tower "has neither romanticism nor structural rationalism but, instead, appears to have been painstakingly invented with a tortured logic through a series of pragmatic and esthetic compromises". As the building was being completed, Huxtable took a less harsh tone to the building, saying that it contained a "clear desire for design quality" despite the drawbacks of the form and roof. A writer for the New York Daily News said: "Put this in Cleveland and it would be the eighth wonder of the world. In New York people hardly look up." Suzanne Stephens wrote for New York magazine that the building was "little more than a modern Fifties high rise in drag", considering the rooftop and base to be wasteful with space.

After the building's completion, it received mixed reception. Paul Goldberger wrote for The New York Times that the roof "is a lot more fun to look at than almost any building top in years", with a reflective facade and a varied form, but the overall design "stops short of doing anything really radical". Jack Egan wrote similarly for The Washington Post, saying that the building had distinctive design features but did not appeal to either nostalgia or novel innovation. Huxtable regarded the plaza as an architectural success but observed in January 1978 that very few people used it. The interior space was described by August Heckscher II, a former New York City parks commissioner, as "an amenity in which we can all rejoice". Nevertheless, Heckscher believed the atrium's silver cladding and light fixtures to be "cold" and suggestive of the indoors, and Stephens found the space to be "claustrophobic" and a "stratified success" whose benefits did not transcend class boundaries.

Other critics described Citicorp Center in a largely positive light. John Tauranac described the tower as the "most dramatic new skyscraper" in New York City since the completion of 30 Rockefeller Plaza several decades prior. Architectural writer Robert A. M. Stern wrote that Citicorp Center was the summation of a "unique architectural and urbanistic character that made Fifty-third Street at once an enclave within midtown and a microcosm of midtown itself". William H. Whyte particularly praised the structure as juxtaposing "a lot of elements at the right moment", particularly the exterior plaza and sidewalk. The building was also praised by publications outside the New York City area. The Baltimore Sun described the building as containing "simplicity [...] that goes beyond sophistication", while The Observer of London called it "a unique contribution to the East Side skyline".

Awards and use as icon 
Upon Citicorp Center's completion, it received several architectural awards. In 1978, the City Club of New York gave the building a Bard Award, which recognized "excellence in architecture and urban design". The same year, it received the American Institute of Steel Construction's Architectural Award of Excellence. The American Institute of Architects gave the building an Honor Award in 1979. Furthermore, Hugh Stubbins and Associates received the AIA's R.S. Reynolds Memorial Award in 1981 for its use of aluminum in the design of Citicorp Center.

The sloped roof of the building has been used for branding; for instance, it is included on the label of Chock full o'Nuts coffee. The roof was also depicted in the Manhattan Mini Storage logo, where the top left corner of the first letter "M" was sloped like the Citigroup Center. Additionally, since 2014, the New York Mets have sometimes used a logo that has included the Citigroup Center, as the bank also sponsors the Mets' home stadium, Citi Field.

See also 

 List of New York City Designated Landmarks in Manhattan from 14th to 59th Streets
 List of tallest buildings in New York City
 List of tallest buildings in the United States
 List of tallest freestanding steel structures

References

Notes

Citations

Sources

External links 

 

1977 establishments in New York City
Bank buildings in Manhattan
Historic bank buildings in the United States
Citigroup buildings
Lexington Avenue
Midtown Manhattan
New York City Designated Landmarks in Manhattan
Office buildings completed in 1977
Privately owned public spaces
Skyscraper office buildings in Manhattan
Third Avenue
Emery Roth buildings